Anadiasa is a genus of moths in the family Lasiocampidae. The genus was erected by Per Olof Christopher Aurivillius in 1904.

Species
Based on Lepidoptera and Some other Life Forms:
Anadiasa undata (Klug, 1832, 1939) Mauritania, Sahara, Egypt
Anadiasa obsoleta (Klug, 1830) Sudan, Egypt

External links

Lasiocampidae
Moth genera